The Shark God may refer to:

The Shark God, American title of the 2004 book The Last Heathen by Charles Montgomery
The Shark God (1913 film), directed by John Griffith Wray
The Shark God, British title of the 1949 American film Omoo-Omoo, the Shark God
 Kāmohoaliʻi, a shark god in Hawaiian religion
 Ukupanipo, a shark god in Hawaiian religion
 Dakuwaqa, a shark god in Fijian mythology
 The Shark God, father of DC Comics' fictional character King Shark

See also
Shark
List of water deities